A micromort (from micro- and mortality) is a unit of risk defined as a one-in-a-million chance of death. Micromorts can be used to measure the riskiness of various day-to-day activities. A microprobability is a one-in-a million chance of some event; thus, a micromort is the microprobability of death. The micromort concept was introduced by Ronald A. Howard who pioneered the modern practice of decision analysis.

Micromorts for future activities can only be rough assessments, as specific circumstances will always have an impact.  However, past historical rates of events can be used to provide a ball park, average figure.

Sample values

Baseline

Leisure and sport

Travel
Activities that increase the death risk by roughly one micromort, and their associated cause of death:
 Travelling 6 miles (9.7 km) by motorcycle (collision)
 Travelling 17 miles (27 km) by walking (collision)
 Travelling 10 miles (16 km) or 20 miles (32 km) by bicycle (collision)
 Travelling 230 miles (370 km) by car (collision)  (or 250 miles)
 Travelling 1,000 miles (1,600 km) by jet (collision)
 Travelling 6,000 miles (9,656 km) by train (collision)

Other 
Increase in death risk for other activities on a per event basis:
 Hang gliding – 8 micromorts per trip
 Ecstasy (MDMA) –  0.5 micromorts per tablet, rising to 13 if using other drugs 
 Giving birth (vaginal) – 120 micromorts
 Giving birth (caesarean) – 170 micromorts
 AstraZeneca vaccination against COVID-19 – 2.9 micromorts
 COVID-19 infection at age 10  – 20 micromorts
 COVID-19 infection at age 25  – 100 micromorts
 COVID-19 infection at age 55  – 4,000 micromorts
 COVID-19 infection at age 65  – 14,000 micromorts
 COVID-19 infection at age 75  – 46,000 micromorts
 COVID-19 infection at age 85  – 150,000 micromorts

Value of a micromort

Willingness to pay 
An application of micromorts is measuring the value that humans place on risk. For example, a person can consider the amount of money they would be willing to pay to avoid a one-in-a-million chance of death (or conversely, the amount of money they would receive to accept a one-in-a-million chance of death). When offered this situation, people claim a high number. However, when looking at their day-to-day actions (e.g., how much they are willing to pay for safety features on cars), a typical value for a micromort is around $50 (in 2009). This is not to say the $50 valuation should be taken to mean that a human life (1 million micromorts) is valued at $50,000,000. Rather, people are less inclined to spend money after a certain point to increase their safety. This means that analyzing risk using the micromort is more useful when using small risks, not necessarily large ones.

Value of a statistical life 
Government agencies use a nominal Value of a Statistical Life (VSL) – or Value for Preventing a Fatality (VPF) – to evaluate the cost-effectiveness of expenditure on safeguards.  For example, in the UK the VSL stands at £1.6 million for road improvements. Since road improvements have the effect of lowering the risk of large numbers of people by a small amount, the UK Department for Transport essentially prices a reduction of 1 micromort at £1.60. The US Department of Transportation uses a VSL of US$6.2 million, pricing a micromort at US$6.20.

Chronic risks

Micromorts are best used to measure the size of acute risks, i.e. immediate deaths. Risks from lifestyle, exposure to air pollution, and so on are chronic risks, in that they do not kill straight away, but reduce life expectancy. Ron Howard included such risks in his original 1979 work, for example an additional one micromort from:
 Drinking 0.5 liter of wine (cirrhosis of the liver)
 Smoking 1.4 cigarettes (cancer, heart disease) 
 Spending 1 hour in a coal mine (black lung disease)
 Spending 3 hours in a coal mine (accident)
 Living 2 days in New York or Boston in 1979 (air pollution)
 Living 2 months with a smoker (cancer, heart disease)
 Drinking Miami water for 1 year (cancer from chloroform)
 Eating 100 charcoal-broiled steaks (cancer from benzopyrene)
 Traveling 6000 miles (10,000 km) by jet (cancer due to increased background radiation)

Such risks are better expressed using the related concept of a microlife.

See also
Decision analysis
Decision theory
Ellsberg paradox
List of unusual units of measurement
Microlife
Pascal's Wager
Precautionary principle
Risk of ruin

Notes

References

Further reading 

Medical aspects of death
Health risk
Units of measurement
Probability assessment